Carex proxima is a tussock-forming species of perennial sedge in the family Cyperaceae. It is native to Madagascar.

See also
List of Carex species

References

proxima
Taxa named by Henri Chermezon
Plants described in 1923
Flora of Madagascar